A National Park in the Whicher Range of South West of Western Australia. The park is home to the protected Petrophile shrub and the source of the Margaret River.

References

See also 
 List of protected areas of Western Australia

National parks of Western Australia
Protected areas established in 2019
South West (Western Australia)
Jarrah Forest